This glossary explains technical terms commonly employed in the description of dinosaur body fossils. Besides dinosaur-specific terms, it covers terms with wider usage, when these are of central importance in the study of dinosaurs or when their discussion in the context of dinosaurs is beneficial. The glossary does not cover ichnological and bone histological terms, nor does it cover measurements.

A

B

C

D

E

F

G

H

I

J

L

M

N

O

P

Q

R

S

T

U

V

W

X

Y

Z

See also
 Bird anatomy
 Glossary of bird terms

References

Dinosaur anatomy
Dinosaurs
Dinosaur anatomy
Wikipedia glossaries using description lists